Santa María Airport  is an airport in Santa María, also known as Santa María del Mar, a district of the Lima Province in Peru.

References

External links
 Aeronautical chart at SkyVector

Airports in Peru
Lima Province